17 Men and Their Music is a live album by the Kenny Clarke/Francy Boland Big Band featuring performances recorded in West Germany in 1967 and first released on producer Gigi Campi's own label. The album's title phrase was added as a subtitle / "sticker" to re-issues of four Clarke-Boland Big Band albums: Faces: Gigi Campi Presents 17 Men and Their Music 1; All Smiles: Gigi Campi Presents 17 Men and Their Music 2; Latin Kaleidoscope: Gigi Campi Presents 17 Men and Their Music 3; Fellini 712: Gigi Campi Presents 17 Men and Their Music 4

Track listing
All compositions by Francy Boland except where noted.
 "Resurrection" (Kenny Clarke)
 "Woody Nightshade"
 "New Eye"
 "Mauve"
 "The 18th Man" (Clarke)
 "Klook's Report" (Clarke)
 "Personeske"
 "Hopeless"
 "Shihab, Humble & Co."
 "You Dig It"
 "The Griffin"
 "Kenny and Kenny"

Personnel 
Kenny Clarke - drums
Francy Boland - piano, arranger
Benny Bailey, Jimmy Deuchar, Shake Keane, Idrees Sulieman - trumpet
Nat Peck, Åke Persson, Eric van Lier - trombone
Derek Humble - alto saxophone
Johnny Griffin, Don Menza, Ronnie Scott,  - tenor saxophone
Sahib Shihab - baritone saxophone, flute
Jimmy Woode - bass
Fats Sadi - percussion

References 

1968 albums
Kenny Clarke/Francy Boland Big Band albums